Cesantes is a small town in Redondela, in the Pontevedra part of the Vigo Metropolitan Area and located in Galicia, an Autonomous Community in northwestern Spain.

Population 
Its population in 2005 was 3,420 (1,747 men and 1,673 women) and its extension is 12 km. The most of the people work in tourism or fishing.

Celebrities of Cesantes 
Iago Bouzón: Recreativo de Huelva football player
Mendinho: Medieval poet

References 

Towns in Spain